Rosa Kellner (21 January 1910 – 13 December 1984) was a German athlete who competed mainly in the 100 metres. She was born in Munich.

She competed for Germany in the 1928 Summer Olympics held in Amsterdam, Netherlands in the 4 x 100 metres where she won the bronze medal with her teammates Leni Schmidt, Anni Holdmann and Leni Junker. At the 1930 Women's World Games she won the gold medal in the 4 x 100 metres event with teammates Agathe Karrer, Luise Holzer and Lisa Gelius.

External links
Rosa Kellner's profile at Sports Reference.com

1910 births
1984 deaths
German female sprinters
Olympic bronze medalists for Germany
Athletes (track and field) at the 1928 Summer Olympics
Olympic athletes of Germany
Sportspeople from Munich
Medalists at the 1928 Summer Olympics
Olympic bronze medalists in athletics (track and field)
Olympic female sprinters